Pancake Rock is an island in the Fox Islands group in the eastern Aleutian Islands, Alaska.

The island is said to resemble a stack of pancakes, hence the name.

References

Islands of Aleutians West Census Area, Alaska
Fox Islands (Alaska)
Islands of Unorganized Borough, Alaska